The Old Courthouse Square in Lake Providence, Louisiana, in East Carroll Parish, was listed on the National Register of Historic Places on October 3, 1980.

It is a two-acre public square.  On the square is the Old East Carroll Parish Courthouse, a two-story building with a three-story side tower with an oculus, built in 1889.  The courthouse is the only Romanesque Revival work in the area.  Also on the square and included in the district is the new East Carroll Parish Courthouse, built in 1935.  It is relatively low, given it is a three-story building.

It was listed along with several other Lake Providence properties and districts that were studied together in the Lake Providence MRA on October 3, 1980.

See also
National Register of Historic Places listings in East Carroll Parish, Louisiana
Lake Providence Commercial Historic District
Lake Providence Residential Historic District
Arlington Plantation
Fischer House
Nelson House

References

National Register of Historic Places in Louisiana
Romanesque Revival architecture in Louisiana
Government buildings completed in 1889
Buildings and structures completed in 1935
East Carroll Parish, Louisiana
Courthouses in Louisiana